Morton Homestead is a historic homestead that is part of Morton Homestead State Park at 100 Lincoln Avenue in Prospect Park, Delaware County, Pennsylvania.

The homestead was founded in 1654 by Morton Mortenson, a Finnish immigrant, when the area was part of the New Sweden colony. Mortenson's great-grandson, John Morton, signed the Declaration of Independence in 1776. Parts of the current house date back to the 1698 with a large addition constructed in the 18th century. The Mortonson–Van Leer Log Cabin was originally on this plantation. 

The site was added to the National Register of Historic Places in 1970.

See also
Mortonson–Van Leer Log Cabin
List of the oldest buildings in Pennsylvania

References

External links
Homestead information
History Lessons from the Morton Homestead

Finnish-American culture in Pennsylvania
Houses on the National Register of Historic Places in Pennsylvania
Houses completed in 1654
Houses in Delaware County, Pennsylvania
New Sweden
National Register of Historic Places in Delaware County, Pennsylvania
1654 establishments in North America
Log buildings and structures on the National Register of Historic Places in Pennsylvania